The National Motor Museum (originally the Montagu Motor Museum) is a museum in the village of Beaulieu, set in the heart of the New Forest, in the English county of Hampshire.

History 

The museum was founded in 1952 by Edward Douglas-Scott-Montagu, 3rd Baron Montagu of Beaulieu, as a tribute to his father, John, 2nd Baron Montagu, who was one of the pioneers of motoring in the United Kingdom, being the first person to drive a motor car into the yard of the Houses of Parliament, and having introduced King Edward VII (then the Prince of Wales) to motoring during the 1890s.

At first, the museum consisted of just five cars and a small collection of automobilia displayed in the front hall of Lord Montagu's ancestral home, Palace House; but such was the popularity of this small display that the collection soon outgrew its home, and was transferred to wooden sheds in the grounds of the house. The reputation and popularity of the Beaulieu collection continued to grow: during 1959, the museum's "attendance figures" reached 296,909.

By 1964, annual attendance exceeded the half a million mark and a decision was taken to create a purpose-built museum building in the grounds of the Beaulieu estate. A design committee chaired by the architect Sir Hugh Casson was created to drive the project, and the architect Leonard Manasseh was given the contract for the design of the building which was primarily the work of his partner Ian Baker.

By 1972, the collection exceeded 300 exhibits.  In a ceremony performed by the Duke of Kent the new purpose-built museum building in the parkland surrounding Palace House was opened on 4 July 1972:  the name was changed to the "National Motor Museum", reflecting a change of status from a private collection to a charitable trust and highlighting Montagu's stated aim to provide Britain with a National Motor Museum "worthy of the great achievements of its motor industry". The opening of the museum coincided with the UK launch of the Jaguar XJ12 which made it an appropriate week for celebrating the UK motor industry. The museum is run by the National Motor Museum Trust Ltd, a registered charity.

An unusual feature of the new museum building in 1972 is the National Motor Museum Monorail passing through its interior. This was inspired by the light railway running through the US Pavilion at the Montreal World's Fair, Expo 67.

The museum today 

See List of vehicles at the National Motor Museum, Beaulieu

Today, in addition to around 250 vehicles manufactured since the late-19th century, the museum has a collection of motoring books, journals, photographs, films, and automobilia of the world and is affiliated to the British Motorcycle Charitable Trust.

An exhibition of James Bond vehicles appeared in 2012.

The "On Screen Cars" exhibit has a display of TV and film cars including Del Boy's Reliant Regal as featured in the BBC sitcom Only Fools and Horses, Mr. Bean’s lime green Mini and Doctor Who'''s Bessie.

The exhibit "World of Top Gear" has cars created by former Top Gear presenters Jeremy Clarkson, Richard Hammond and James May.

The museum also hosts a collection of the well-known Rolls-Royce radiator mascot – the Spirit of Ecstasy – also known as the Flying Lady. The collection includes The Whisper, a figurine commissioned by John Walter Edward Douglas-Scott-Montagu, the 2nd Baron to his friend Charles Robinson Sykes who sculpted a personal mascot for the bonnet of his Rolls-Royce Silver Ghost. Sykes originally crafted a figurine of a female model, Eleanor Thornton, in fluttering robes, pressing a finger against her lips – to symbolise the secret of the love between John and Eleanor, his secretary. The figurine was consequently named The Whisper.

Additional attractions include the National Motor Museum Monorail, veteran bus ride, playground, restaurant and a substantial part of the Palace House and grounds, including the partially ruined Beaulieu Abbey. Among the monastery buildings to have been preserved are the domus (now used for functions and exhibitions), and the refectory, which is now the parish church.

Beaulieu attractions
The National Motor Museum is one of several attractions on Lord Montagu's Beaulieu estate which are marketed jointly as "Beaulieu". One admission ticket includes the following attractions:

 Beaulieu Abbey
 National Motor Museum
 Beaulieu Palace House
 World of Top Gear''
 Secret Army Exhibition – an exhibit about the Special Operations Executive (SOE) training at Beaulieu during World War II
 Gardens
 National Motor Museum Monorail

See also
 List of motorcycles in the National Motor Museum, Beaulieu
 List of vehicles at the National Motor Museum, Beaulieu

References

External links

 Beaulieu website
 The National Motor Museum Trust website

Museums established in 1952
Entertainment One
Automobile museums in England
Museums in Hampshire
Transport museums in England
Motorcycle museums in the United Kingdom
Auto racing museums and halls of fame
Media museums
1952 establishments in England